Rudolf Krause (30 March 1907 – 11 April 1987) was a racing driver from East Germany.

Biography
Born in Reichenbach im Vogtland, Krause is mainly known as one of the leading sportsmen in motor racing in Formula Two, during his career between 1927 and 1954, beside other Formula Two drivers like Hans Stuck. In 1952 and 1953 he participated in two World Championship Grands Prix. He scored no championship points and his only finish was 14th in the 1953 German Grand Prix.
When Krause’s career began in 1927, he mainly raced in motorcycles. He switched to self-modified cars in the beginning of the 1930s. Soon after Krause’s career began, he set up his own mechanic shop inside of his garage in Reichenbach, and raced in his own BMW sports car. Krause’s formula racing career debuted in 1949 when racing in East Germany itself began races after the Second World War. Krause was a top contender when East Germany ran its own formula racing Grand Prix and championships between 1950 and 1953, placing in top positions several times and winning the formula 2 East German Championship in its last year of existence. He mainly drove in BMW race cars, many of which were at least partially built in his own workshop in Reichenbach.  When Krause retired in 1954, it was mainly because of his age. However, it also awards him the distinction of one of the few East German drivers to not defect to western Germany to further his career.

Complete World Championship Grand Prix results
(key)

References

Sources
 

1907 births
1987 deaths
German racing drivers
People from Reichenbach im Vogtland
Racing drivers from Saxony
East German Formula One drivers